D.D Dumbo is the solo project of the Australian, Castlemaine-based musician, Oliver Hugh Perry, who began the project in 2013 with the release of his self-titled debut EP Tropical Oceans, released by The Blue Rider in 2013 and later re-released by 4AD in 2014. The EP received positive reviews and from here, Perry was invited to attend South by Southwest in the same year, where he was signed by 4AD. Perry also supported Warpaint, Tune-Yards, St. Vincent, Jungle and Iron & Wine in 2013.

In 2014, D.D Dumbo played his first shows in the UK and the US, supporting both Daughter and Tame Impala. He also played at Splendour in the Grass in July as well as Pitchfork Paris Festival. His debut album Utopia Defeated was recorded over the winter of 2015 and released on 7 October 2016 by Liberation in Australia and New Zealand and 4AD in the rest of the world. The album was released to positive reviews from FasterLouder, Rolling Stone Australia, and AllMusic. In November 2016, D.D Dumbo was nominated for the J Award for Best Music Video and Best Australian Album and won Best Australian Album.

In February 2017, D.D Dumbo performed at St Jerome's Laneway Festival, as well as winning Song of the Year at the APRA Music Awards of 2017  for "Satan". He was also nominated for four awards in the 2017 ARIA Awards, including Best Adult Contemporary Album, Best Male Artist, Engineer of the Year and Producer Of The Year.

Discography

Studio albums

Extended plays

Singles

Awards and nominations

Australian Music Prize
The Australian Music Prize (the AMP) is an annual award of $30,000 given to an Australian band or solo artist in recognition of the merit of an album released during the year of award. It commenced in 2005.

|-
| 2016
| Utopia Defeated
| Australian Music Prize
| 
|-

AIR Awards
The Australian Independent Record Awards (commonly known informally as AIR Awards) is an annual awards night to recognise, promote and celebrate the success of Australia's Independent Music sector.

|-
| AIR Awards of 2014
| themselves
| Breakthrough Independent Artist
| 
|-
| rowspan="4" | AIR Awards of 2017
| rowspan="2" | themselves 
| Best Independent Artist
| 
|-
| Breakthrough Independent Artist
| 
|-
| Utopia Defeated
| Best Independent Album
| 
|-
| "Satan"
| Best Independent Single or EP
| 
|-

APRA Awards
The APRA Awards are presented annually from 1982 by the Australasian Performing Right Association (APRA), "honouring composers and songwriters".

|-
| APRA Music Awards of 2017 |
| "Satan"
| Song of the Year 
|

ARIA Music Awards
The ARIA Music Awards is an annual awards ceremony that recognises excellence, innovation, and achievement across all genres of Australian music.

|-
| rowspan="4"| 2017
| rowspan="2"| Utopia Defeated
| Best Male Artist
| 
|-
| Best Adult Contemporary Album
| 
|-
| rowspan="2"| Oliver Hugh Perry & Fabian Prynn for Utopia Defeated
| Producer of the Year
| 
|-
| Engineer of the Year
|

J Awards
The J Awards are an annual series of Australian music awards that were established by the Australian Broadcasting Corporation's youth-focused radio station Triple J. The awards are given in an on-air ceremony held in November each year as part of triple j's AusMusic Month.

|-
| rowspan="2"| 2016 
| Utopia Defeated
| Australian Album of the Year
| 
|-
| "Satan" by D.D Dumbo (directed by Jim Elson)
| Australian Video of the Year
|

Music Victoria Awards
The Music Victoria Awards are an annual awards night celebrating Victorian music. They commenced in 2006.

! 
|-
|rowspan="2"| Music Victoria Awards of 2014
|rowspan="2"| D.D Dumbo
| Best Emerging Artist
| 
|rowspan="6"| 
|-
| Best Regional Act
| 
|-
| Music Victoria Awards of 2015
| D.D Dumbo
| Best Regional Act
| 
|-
| Music Victoria Awards of 2016
| D.D Dumbo
| Best Regional Act
| 
|-
|rowspan="2"| Music Victoria Awards of 2017
| D.D Dumbo
| Best Male Artist
| 
|-
| D.D Dumbo
| Best Regional Act
| 
|-

References

Musicians from Victoria (Australia)
4AD artists